Sam Ramsbottom (born 3 April 1996) is an English professional footballer who plays as a goalkeeper for Edinburgh.

Ramsbottom has played for Tranmere Rovers, Burscough, Droylsden, Bootle, Witton Albion, Galway United, Barrow, Macclesfield Town, Alfreton Town, Greenock Morton and Dumbarton.

Career
Born in Greasby, Ramsbottom began his career with Tranmere Rovers, joining them at the age of 7 and spending time on loan with Burscough, Droylsden, Bootle and Witton Albion before signing for Irish club Galway United in July 2016. After a short spell with Barrow he signed for Macclesfield Town in September 2017. He then spent time with Alfreton Town before signing a one-year contract with Scottish club Greenock Morton in June 2019. He left Morton at the end of the 2019–20 season, and went on trial with Falkirk in September 2020.  After his spell on trial with Falkirk ended and offers overseas were stopped by the Covid-19 pandemic, Ramsbottom joined Dumbarton in March 2021. After establishing himself as the club's number one, Ramsbottom extended his contract with the club in June 2021. He left the Sons in May 2022 following their relegation to Scottish League Two.

References

1996 births
Living people
Sportspeople from Wirral
English footballers
Tranmere Rovers F.C. players
Burscough F.C. players
Droylsden F.C. players
Bootle F.C. players
Witton Albion F.C. players
Galway United F.C. players
Barrow A.F.C. players
Macclesfield Town F.C. players
Alfreton Town F.C. players
Greenock Morton F.C. players
Scottish Professional Football League players
Association football goalkeepers
Dumbarton F.C. players
F.C. Edinburgh players